Josey Jewell (born December 25, 1994) is an American football linebacker for the Denver Broncos of the National Football League (NFL). He played college football at Iowa.

Early years
Jewell attended Decorah High School in Decorah, Iowa, where he played high school football as a linebacker and running back. Jewell helped his team appear in back-to-back 3A State Title Games, defeating Sioux City Bishop Heelan by a score of 49–21 in the 2012 game. His senior year, he finished the season with 1314 rushing yards, 21 rushing touchdowns, and 81 total tackles. Josey Jewell was rated as a two-star prospect by 247Sports with a composite score of .7783. He committed to the University of Iowa to play college football.

College career
After redshirting his first year at Iowa in 2013, Jewell played in 11 games and made four starts in 2014. He finished the season with 51 tackles and one sack. As a sophomore in 2015, he started all 14 games and led the team with 126 tackles, three sacks, and four interceptions. As a junior in 2016, Jewell started all 13 games and again led the team with 124 tackles with 1.5 sacks. He was second-team All-Big Ten for the second straight season, and a finalist for the Butkus Award. As a senior in 2017, he won the Jack Lambert Award, was a finalist for the Bronko Nagurski Trophy, and was named the Big Ten Defensive Player of the Year after leading the Big Ten with 125 tackles.

Statistics

Professional career

The Denver Broncos selected Jewell in the fourth round (106th overall) of the 2018 NFL Draft. Jewell was the 14th linebacker drafted in 2018.

On May 10, 2018, the Denver Broncos signed Jewell to a four-year, $3.17 million contract that includes a signing bonus of $713,982.

He entered training camp and competed for a role as a backup inside linebacker against Zaire Anderson, Joseph Jones, Jerrol Garcia-Williams, and Keishawn Bierria.

In his second career NFL regular season game versus the Oakland Raiders, Jewell recorded two combined tackles.

In Week 4 of the 2020 season against the New York Jets on Thursday Night Football, Jewell recorded a team high ten tackles and sacked Sam Darnold twice during the 37–28 win.

On September 21, 2021, Jewell was placed on injured reserve with a pectoral injury.

On March 15, 2022, Jewell signed a two-year contract extension with the Broncos.

On December 11, 2022, Jewell recorded two interceptions and nine tackles in the 34-28 loss.

References

External links

Iowa Hawkeyes bio
Denver Broncos bio

1994 births
Living people
People from Decorah, Iowa
Players of American football from Iowa
American football linebackers
Iowa Hawkeyes football players
All-American college football players
Denver Broncos players